N. S. Madhavan (born 9 September 1948) is an Indian writer of Malayalam literature. Known for his novel, Lanthan Batheriyile Luthiniyakal (Litanies of the Dutch Battery) and a host of short stories such as Higuita, Thiruthu, Chulaimedile Shavangal and Vanmarangal Veezhumpol, Madhavan also writes football columns and travel articles. He is a distinguished fellow of Kerala Sahitya Akademi and a recipient of several major awards including Odakkuzhal Award, Kerala Sahitya Akademi Award for Story, Kerala Sahitya Akademi Award for Novel, Muttathu Varkey Award, Mathrubhumi Literary Award and Crossword Book Award. Kerala State Students Federation Sahithyolsav Award

Biography 
N. S. Madhavan, born on September 9, 1948 in the port city of Cochin did his school education at Sree Rama Varma High School and graduated in economics from Maharaja's College, Ernakulam. His post-graduate studies were at the Department of Economics, University of Kerala. During this period he began writing, and in 1970 won the top prize for his first published short story 'Shishu', in a contest organised by the Malayalam literary magazine Mathrubhumi. He joined the Indian Administrative Service in 1975 and started his administrative career as a member of the Bihar cadre. After serving in Bihar in various capacities, he returned to his home state in 1988.

Madhavan is married to Sheela Reddy, a book editor of Outlook, an English magazine published in New Delhi. Their daughter, Meenakshi Reddy Madhavan is a well-known blogger and the author of works such as You Are Here, Confessions of a Listmaniac and Cold Feet.

Writing career

Stories 

In the 1980s, Madhavan went through a decade-long period of writer's block, until the release of his story 'Higuita' in 1990. In this work, Madhavan models his protagonist, Father Geevarghese, on René Higuita, the 1990 FIFA World Cup goalkeeper for Colombia and his unconventional playing style whereby he would often abandon his goal and try to score goals, occupies the priest's imagination. Likewise, he temporarily abandons his cassock and saves a tribal girl Lucie from the clutches of the trafficker Jabbar. The short story was rated among the best Malayalam stories in the last century. It has since been adapted into a play, Higuita: A Goalie’s Anxiety at Penalty Kick, by Sasidharan Naduvil. Thiruthu, based on the Babri Masjid demolition, Chulaimedile Shavangal (Corpses of Chulaimed), Vanmarangal Veezhumpol (When the Big Trees Fall), Paryaya Kathakal (Synonymous Stories), Nilavili (The Cry), Muyal Vetta (Hare Hunt) and Nalam Lokam (The Fourth World) are some of his other notable short stories. His stories are known to represent the uncertainties, ambiguities and tragedies of the modern world.

Novel 
After thirty-three years as a writer, Madhavan published his debut novel in 2003 as Lanthan Batheriyile Luthiniyakal. The novel is about the life on an imaginary island in the Kochi backwaters, named after a 17th-century battery (bathery in Malayalam) of five cannons installed on its promontory by the Dutch (Lanthans in Malayalam). Jessica, the young narrator of the story, is the scion of a family of carpenters with a long tradition of boat building. Her reminiscences start from the days when she was inside her pregnant mother's womb. The novel presents an intimate picture of life of the Latin Christians of the Kerala coast, descendants of poor, low-caste Hindus who were converted to Christianity by Portuguese colonists in the 16th century. The first edition of the novel was sold out in a month.

The novel is set between 1951 and 1967, the first sixteen years of Jessica life, but draws upon history going back to the time of Vasco Da Gama. She was born at a time when people used to run away from cow-pox vaccinators as well as the period when Kerala embraced communism, which the novelist calls the watermelon years – an allusion to the verdant green-canopied Kerala with its hidden red watermelons. There are captivating descriptions of Latin catholic residents of the Dutch Battery preparing themselves for months prior to the staging of Karalman Charitham a Chavittu Nadakam or an operatic play about Charlemagne, originally written in Tamil and pidgin Latin by Chinnathambi Annavi in the 16th century. Set against the background of the city of Madhavan's birth, Kochi, the Lanthan Batheriyile Luthiniyakal is a roller coaster ride through micro histories, the nascent days of a newly independent country, the growth and decline of ideas, and the randomness of events affecting human lives. Well-known Malayalam novelist M. Mukundan made the following assessment after reviewing the novel, "N.S. Madhavan has rejuvenated Malayalam fiction." He summarises the novel thus: "[The book] is all about history and imagination—the protogonists of new fiction that is in vogue." Mukundan added, "The novel is heavily populated with communists, priests, carpenters, cooks, boatmen, librarians, school teachers, even tailors. At times you will come across history makers from faraway Russia – Joseph Stalin, Imre Nagy, Nikita Khrushchev..."

Other works 
In 2006, Madhavan published has written two plays, Rayum Mayum and Arbhudhavaidyan, published together as a book, Randu Natakangal, in 2006. His novel Lanthanbatheriyile Luthiniyakal was translated into English by Rajesh Rajamohan under the title Litanies of Dutch Battery and published in October 2010 by Penguin Books. The work was the winner of the 2010 Crossword Book Award (Indian language translations) and featured in the Man Asian Literary Prize long list and the 2011 The Hindu Literary Prize short list. Kaya Taran, the 2004 Hindi movie by Sashi Kumar, is based on When Big Trees Fall, a short story by Madhavan about the homicidal attacks on the Sikhs that followed the Assassination of Indira Gandhi, the then Indian Prime Minister. He also edited one book, Malayala Kathakal, composed of 60 short stories by various writers.

Awards
Madhavan, who topped the field in a literary competition conducted by Mathrubhumi in 1970 for his short story, Shishu, received the Padmarajan Award for his work, Thiruthu in 1993 and a year later, he received the 1994 Odakkuzhal Award for Higuita. Higuita was selected for another award in 1995, the Kerala Sahitya Akademi Award for Story; he would receive another award from Kerala Sahitya Akademi in 2004, Kerala Sahitya Akademi Award for Novel for Lanthan Batheriyile Luthiniyakal. The novel was included in the long list for the 2007 Man Asian Literary Prize, the prize eventually going to the Chinese novel, Wolf Totem. He received one more award for Higuita, the Muttathu Varkey Award in 2009 followed by the Padmaprabha Literary Award, the same year. The English translation of his novel, Litanies of Dutch Battery, was shortlisted for The Hindu Literary Prize in 2011. Kerala Sahitya Akademi honoured him with fellowship in 2013. He received the Padmaprabha Literary Prize in 2015 and two awards in 2018, the Mathrubhumi Literary Award and the Literary Award of the Bahrain Keraleeya Samajam.

Bibliography

Novels

Short stories 
 
 
 
 
 
 
 

 
 
 Nalam Lokam

Plays

Essays

Articles

Translations to other languages

Further reading

References

External links 

 
 
 

Living people
Writers from Kochi
Malayalam-language writers
Malayalam short story writers
Malayalam novelists
Recipients of the Kerala Sahitya Akademi Award
Maharaja's College, Ernakulam alumni
1948 births
20th-century Indian essayists
Indian male screenwriters
Indian male novelists
21st-century Indian novelists
Indian male essayists
Indian male short story writers
21st-century Indian dramatists and playwrights
Screenwriters from Kerala
Novelists from Kerala
20th-century Indian male writers
21st-century Indian male writers